Jill Ackles is an American television soap opera director. Jill has directed for soap operas such as Days of Our Lives, All My Children, and One Life to Live. Jill occasionally draws doodles for Doodle Day. Jill was nominated for a Daytime Emmy Award for Outstanding Drama Series Directing Team shared with fellow directors of All My Children in 1997.

Career
Jill Ackles has directed several different soap operas. Jill was nominated for a Daytime Emmy in 1997 for her work on All My Children.

Filmography

Awards and nominations
Daytime Emmy Award
Nominated, 1997, Directing, All My Children

References

External links

American television directors
American women television directors
Living people
Place of birth missing (living people)
Year of birth missing (living people)
American soap opera directors